Alain Bolduc (born 3 August 1972) is a Canadian windsurfer. He competed in the men's Mistral One Design event at the 1996 Summer Olympics.

References

External links
 
 
 

1972 births
Living people
Canadian windsurfers
Canadian male sailors (sport)
Olympic sailors of Canada
Sailors at the 1996 Summer Olympics – Mistral One Design
Sportspeople from Montreal